The arrondissement of Thonon-les-Bains is an arrondissement of France in the Haute-Savoie department in the Auvergne-Rhône-Alpes region. It has 68 communes.

Composition

The communes of the arrondissement of Thonon-les-Bains, and their INSEE codes, are:
 
 Abondance (74001)
 Allinges (74005)
 Anthy-sur-Léman (74013)
 Armoy (74020)
 Ballaison (74025)
 La Baume (74030)
 Bellevaux (74032)
 Bernex (74033)
 Le Biot (74034)
 Boëge (74037)
 Bogève (74038)
 Bonnevaux (74041)
 Bons-en-Chablais (74043)
 Brenthonne (74048)
 Burdignin (74050)
 Cervens (74053)
 Champanges (74057)
 La Chapelle-d'Abondance (74058)
 Châtel (74063)
 Chens-sur-Léman (74070)
 Chevenoz (74073)
 Douvaine (74105)
 Draillant (74106)
 Essert-Romand (74114)
 Évian-les-Bains (74119)
 Excenevex (74121)
 Fessy (74126)
 Féternes (74127)
 La Forclaz (74129)
 Habère-Lullin (74139)
 Habère-Poche (74140)
 Larringes (74146)
 Loisin (74150)
 Lugrin (74154)
 Lullin (74155)
 Lully (74156)
 Lyaud (74157)
 Margencel (74163)
 Marin (74166)
 Massongy (74171)
 Maxilly-sur-Léman (74172)
 Meillerie (74175)
 Messery (74180)
 Montriond (74188)
 Morzine (74191)
 Nernier (74199)
 Neuvecelle (74200)
 Novel, Haute-Savoie (74203)
 Orcier (74206)
 Perrignier (74210)
 Publier (74218)
 Reyvroz (74222)
 Saint-André-de-Boëge (74226)
 Saint-Gingolph (74237)
 Saint-Jean-d'Aulps (74238)
 Saint-Paul-en-Chablais (74249)
 Saxel (74261)
 Sciez (74263)
 Seytroux (74271)
 Thollon-les-Mémises (74279)
 Thonon-les-Bains (74281)
 Vacheresse (74286)
 Vailly (74287)
 Veigy-Foncenex (74293)
 La Vernaz (74295)
 Villard (74301)
 Vinzier (74308)
 Yvoire (74315)

History

The arrondissement of Thonon-les-Bains was created in 1860.

As a result of the reorganisation of the cantons of France which came into effect in 2015, the borders of the cantons are no longer related to the borders of the arrondissements. The cantons of the arrondissement of Thonon-les-Bains were, as of January 2015:

 Abondance
 Le Biot
 Boëge
 Douvaine
 Évian-les-Bains
 Thonon-les-Bains-Est
 Thonon-les-Bains-Ouest

References

Thonon-les-Bains